Ericsson-LG is a joint venture company owned by the Swedish group Ericsson (75%) and the South Korean group LG Electronics (25%). Founded in November 2005, it engineers and designs telecommunications equipment, with LG providing distribution and marketing. The company, which has approximately 1,500 employees, designs and markets devices for telecommunications networks operators and enterprises in Korea and internationally. On 29 June 2010, Ericsson bought Nortel's stake in LG-Nortel (Ericsson-LG's former name), and subsequently renamed it LG-Ericsson. On 22 March 2012, Ericsson raised its stake to 75%. On 10 April 2012, LG-Ericsson appointed Martin Wiktorin as CEO.
On 1 Sep 2012, LG-Ericsson changed its name to Ericsson-LG.

Key products 

The company has developed a range of IP phones (MGCP / SIP / H.323), wireless and outposts such as videophones (SIP) compatible with ToIP IP Centrex for the market businesses and operators.
The company also sells residential LAN switching products, such as the LG-nortel ES24 (24 port Fast Ethernet Switch) and the ES08, an 8 port fast Ethernet switch. The units are manufactured by ANATEL.

On May 14, 2007, the company introduced three new products for unified communications compatible with Microsoft Office Communications Server 2007 and Microsoft Office Communicator 2007. For example, the terminal LG-Nortel IP Phone 8540's includes  the operating system Windows CE, and Microsoft Office Communicator 2007. It also includes a biometric reader for security. The user can at any time consult their Outlook calendar, mail or the condition of presence of his associates on the telephone.

In August 2008, the company acquired Novera Optics, a developer of fiber-optics that extend high-speed carrier Ethernet services, for approximately $16M in cash, plus up to an additional $10M to Novera security holders based on achievement of future business milestones over the next 18 months.

The company has also developed a range of IP PABX hybrids, known as Aria Soho, the market for SOHO / SME.

Composition of the shareholding

Nortel paid $145 million for 50% stake plus one share, with LG Electronics taking the balance.

Due to Nortel's bankruptcy, this 50% plus one share was sold to LM Ericsson for $242 million.

On 22 March 2012, Ericsson purchased a further 50% of LG Electronics shares, taking its total holding to 75% plus one share.

References 

Ericsson
LG Electronics
Nortel
Telecommunications equipment vendors
Teleconferencing
Videotelephony